The Rhythmic Gymnastics World Championships are the world championships for the sport of rhythmic gymnastics. The tournament is promoted and organized by the Fédération Internationale de Gymnastique (FIG). It is one of the three tournaments in rhythmic gymnastics officially organized by FIG, as well as the Rhythmic Gymnastics World Cup and the gymnastics competitions at the Olympic Games (in collaboration with the IOC and the federation of the country organising the Games). The first edition of the World Championships was held in 1963, a time when the sport was known as modern gymnastics. The current program of the World Championships contemplates both individual and group performances. In even non-Olympic years and the year before the Olympics, a team event is also contested. Two events are not competed at the World Championships anymore: individual rope and free hands.

Historically rhythmic gymnastics has been dominated by Eastern European countries, especially the Soviet Union and Bulgaria. Following the fall of the Soviet Union, there was originally a clear dominance of post-Soviet countries at the World Championships, namely Russia, Ukraine and Belarus but with other nations emerging, for example Italy, Israel, Spain and Bulgaria. The only non-European nations to successfully achieve medal positions at the World Championships are Japan, China, North Korea and South Korea. Only five individual gymnasts (Sun Duk Jo, Myong Sim Choi, Mitsuru Hiraguchi, Son Yeon-jae, Kaho Minagawa) and three groups (Japan, North Korea and China) from outside Europe have won medals at the World Championships.

Editions

Medalists

Dominant nations include Soviet Union (as well as its subsequent independent states, namely Russia, Ukraine, Belarus and Azerbaijan) and Bulgaria.

Individual All-Around

Group All-Around

All-time medal table

Last updated after the 2022 World Championships.

 At the 2021 Rhythmic Gymnastics World Championships in Kitakyushu, Japan, in accordance with a ban by the World Anti-Doping Agency (WADA) and a decision by the Court of Arbitration for Sport (CAS), athletes from Russia were not permitted to use the Russian name, flag, or anthem. They instead participated under name and flag of the RGF (Russian Gymnastics Federation).

Multiple gold medalists

Boldface denotes active rhythmic gymnasts and highest medal count among all rhythmic gymnasts (including these who not included in these tables) per type.

All events

Individual events

Records

See also
 Rhythmic Gymnastics World Cup
 :Category:Rhythmic Gymnastics Asian Championships
 Rhythmic Gymnastics European Championships
 Commonwealth Rhythmic Gymnastics Championships
 FIG World Cup
 Gymnastics at the World Games
 Gymnastics at the Summer Olympics

References 

 
World Championships
Recurring sporting events established in 1963